"Only Tender Love" is the third single from Scottish band Deacon Blue's fourth studio album, Whatever You Say, Say Nothing (1993). The song on the single is an edited version of the album track. The track reached  22 in the UK Singles Chart in May 1993. The B-sides are "Pimp Talking" and "Cracks You Up".

In addition to the standard single releases, a special edition CD single entitled "The Riches Collection Part 1" was issued.  In addition to "Only Tender Love, it contained three tracks from the Riches limited edition bonus album that was originally released in 1998 as a temporary bundle with Raintown.  This special edition single came in a black box that was wide enough to hold additional CDs, the intent being that future special edition CD singles would contain B-sides that would eventually complete the entire Riches album.

Track listings 
All songs written by Ricky Ross, except where noted:

References

Deacon Blue songs
1991 songs
1993 singles
Columbia Records singles
Songs written by Ricky Ross (musician)